Kalyan Varma is a Bangalore-based wildlife filmmaker, photographer and conservationist. He is one of the founders of Peepli Project, co-director of Nature InFocus nature and wildlife festival, and founding member of India Nature Watch. He currently freelances with BBC Natural History, Netflix, Discovery Channel, National Geographic and Disney+, and also works with grassroots NGOs like Nature Conservation Foundation to highlight environmental issues in India. He is a recipient of the National film awards for his film Wild Karnataka and Carl Zeiss Wildlife Conservation Award.

Earlier life 
Kalyan studied mechanical engineering from P.E.S. Institute of Technology, Bangalore South Campus and right after joined Yahoo! in 2001. He headed the security division of Yahoo and at that time was active in open-source software and Linux communities in India and was active in pushing these technologies in the society. He was one of the core members of the annual conference FOSS.IN. He won the superstar award in Yahoo, given to ten employees globally each year. At the end of 2004 he quit his job in order to pursue nature photography. He worked in Biligiriranga Hills for more than a year before he took up full time wildlife photography and filmmaking as a profession.

Community initiatives
Kalyan is involved in fostering community among photographers and wildlife conservationists since his early years. 

In 2004 he, along with a team of photographers, founded India Nature watch, an online community which now has become the largest platform for wildlife photographers in Asia. This community was involved in pushing conservation of wildlife in India via visual media. 

In 2015, he co-founded the slow-journalism initiative the Peepli project, which delves deep into the unreported, under-reported, themes that public discourse currently abdicates. Kalyan undertook a year long project to document human-elephant conflict in Karnataka.

He is one of the co-founders of Nature InFocus, an annual festival, portal, contest and a documentary production company which is one of the largest in the world, focussed on nature photography and conservation.

Kalyan is best known for directing and producing the film Wild Karnataka which was the first nature film to be released in Cinema in India.

Wildlife documentaries
Kalyan has in the last decade dedicated himself to make wildlife documentaries. He has made various wildlife documentaries for the BBC and National Geographic Channel.

 2008 BBC The Mountains of the Monsoon
 2009 BBC One million snake bites 
 2011 National Geographic Secrets of Wild India
 2012 BBC Life Story (TV series)
 2014 BBC Wonders of the Monsoon
 2015 BBC India: Natures Wonderland
2017 ORF sky river : Brahmaputra
 2017 BBC Big Cats
 2019 Wild Karnataka (2019 film)
2019 Netflix Our planet
2020 BBC Primates 
2021 Netflix Attenborough Life in Colour

 2021 David Attenborough: A Life On Our Planet

Awards
 2015 Sanctuary Asia - Wildlife photographer of the year 
 2013 NHM photographer of the year - Biological Realms 
 2015 Asferico international nature photography contest  
 2015 Por el Planeta - First place in Animal Behaviour 
 2017 Carl Zeiss Wildlife Conservation award 
 2021 India National film award

References

External links
 

1980 births
Indian wildlife photographers
Indian documentary filmmakers
Living people
Film directors from Bangalore
Photographers from Karnataka
21st-century Indian photographers